The Lafford High School, Billinghay was a secondary-level, co-educational Community School in Billinghay, a village in the English county of Lincolnshire. Serving pupils aged 11 to 16, Lafford closed in 2010. The school used a secondary modern admissions system and had a capacity for 365 pupils.

See also
 Education in Lincolnshire

Notable former pupils
 Air Vice-Marshal Stuart Butler, former Nimrod pilot, commanded 206 Sqn and Station Commander of RAF Kinloss

References 

Defunct schools in Lincolnshire
North Kesteven District
Secondary schools in Lincolnshire